Darío Rául Caballero (born 1 January 1977) is a retired Paraguayan football defender.

Caballero spent most of his years playing for Paraguayan teams such as Cerro Porteño, Libertad and Olimpia, but also played for teams in Argentina, Colombia, Ecuador and Peru.

He last played for Club Fernando de la Mora before retiring in 2011 at the age of 34.

External links
 Darío Caballero at BDFA.com.ar 
 Darío Caballero – Argentine Primera statistics at Fútbol XXI

References 

1977 births
Living people
Paraguayan footballers
Paraguayan expatriate footballers
Cerro Porteño players
Chacarita Juniors footballers
S.D. Quito footballers
Deportivo Cali footballers
Club Olimpia footballers
Club Universitario de Deportes footballers
Club Atlético Independiente footballers
Paraguayan Primera División players
Argentine Primera División players
Categoría Primera A players
Ecuadorian Serie A players
Peruvian Primera División players
Expatriate footballers in Argentina
Expatriate footballers in Colombia
Expatriate footballers in Ecuador
Expatriate footballers in Peru
Sportspeople from Luque
Association football defenders